Kovylkinsky District (Lašmoń ajmak; , Kovölbuje) is an administrative and municipal district (raion), one of the twenty-two in the Republic of Mordovia, Russia. It is located in the south of the republic. Its administrative center is the town of Kovylkino (which is not administratively a part of the district). As of the 2010 Census, the total population of the district was 22,523.

Administrative and municipal status
Within the framework of administrative divisions, Kovylkinsky District is one of the twenty-two in the republic. The district is divided into 21 selsoviets which comprise 106 rural localities. The town of Kovylkino serves as its administrative center, despite being incorporated separately as a town of republic significance—an administrative unit with the status equal to that of the districts.

As a municipal division, the district is incorporated as Kovylkinsky Municipal District, with the town of republic significance of Kovylkino being incorporated within it as Kovylkino Urban Settlement. Its twenty-one selsoviets are incorporated as twenty-one rural settlements within the municipal district. The town of Kovylkino serves as the administrative center of the municipal district as well.

Notable people
Soviet/Russian artist Fedot Sychkov was born in 1870 in the territory of modern Kovylkinsky District, in the selo of Kochelayevo. Sychkov museum was opened in 1970.

Footballer Mikhail Markin was born in 1993 in Kovylkino.

References

Notes

Sources

 
Districts of Mordovia